Czesław Fiedorowicz  (born 21 February 1958 in Gubin) is a Polish politician. He was elected to the Sejm on 25 September 2005, getting 16,153 votes in 8 Zielona Góra district, as a candidate from the Civic Platform list.

He was also a member of Sejm 1993-1997 and Sejm 1997-2001.

See also
Members of Polish Sejm 2005-2007

External links
Czesław Fiedorowicz - parliamentary page - includes declarations of interest, voting record, and transcripts of speeches.

Members of the Polish Sejm 2005–2007
Members of the Polish Sejm 1993–1997
Members of the Polish Sejm 1997–2001
Civic Platform politicians
1958 births
Living people
People from Gubin, Poland